Carlie Wagner (born May 16, 1995) is an American basketball guard that was drafted in the 3rd Round of the 2018 WNBA Draft by the Minnesota Lynx of the Women's National Basketball Association (WNBA).

Notes

1995 births
Living people
American women's basketball players
Basketball players from Minnesota
Guards (basketball)
Minnesota Lynx draft picks